The Flame of Peace (Flamme des Friedens) (not be confused with the 2nd European Games torch relay "Flame of Peace") is an award granted by the private Austrian organization Verein zur Förderung des Friedens (Association for the Promotion of Peace), which promotes world peace. Its symbol is a flame carving in wood and mounted on a stone base. The organization presents awards to mostly non-prominent people, self-styled peace activists, and organizations in recognition of their activity in promoting peace.

Organization and leadership
Herta Margarete Habsburg-Lothringen, then known as Herta Margaret Öfferl, and her deputy Sandor Habsburg-Lothringen, now her husband, founded the organization in January 2007. She had already been working for several years on the promotion of peace initiatives. She serves as its president. 

The organization claims to be non-profit, non-partisan and religiously unaligned. It is dedicated to promoting and rewarding endeavors to promote peace. It has given awards to individuals and organizations since 2008. Recipients have included politicians, diplomats, media representatives and peace activists, mostly unknown and of dubious behavior. The symbol of the prize is a wood carving of a flame mounted on a stone base.

The board of the Association consists only of family members, Herta Margarete and Sandor Habsburg-Lothringen as well as the children of Herta Margarete. There are no independent informations about their goals and earnings from their activity. The Habsburg-Lothringens use the titles of Archdukes of Austria and Prince of Tuscany, styled as Imperial Highness. In contrast to their conduct, Sandor Habsburg-Lothringen, son of Dominic Habsburg-Lothringen, is only listed as a Count of Habsburg in the Almanach de Gotha Edition of 2000. Being Austrian citizens, neither are allowed to use titles and surnames that allude to nobility at all in their home country.

Criticism

In 2009 the award was given to Ali Abdullah Saleh during his attack against Houthi rebels and in 2016 to Khalifa bin Salman Al Khalifa, prime minister of Bahrain. The British journalist Brian Whitaker calling the organisation's award a "dodgy peace prize".

The leaders of the organization are also criticised by the Sovereign Military Order of Malta for their use of the title "Protector" of the dubious fake order "Sovereign Hospitaller Order of St. John of Jerusalem – Knights of Malta" as a "pretended title of a pseudo-order".

In 2018 Herta and Sandor Habsburg unveiled a peace monument in Gera in the presence of Heinrich XIII Prinz Reuss, later arrested on charges of plotting a far-right coup d'état against the German government being the leader of a sinister group that has been conspiring since November 2021 to storm the German House of Parliament. In 2019, Reuss was also present in Vienna at the FOWPAL event "Celebrating the First International Day of Conscience", organized by the 2018 Flame of Peace award winner Dr. Tao-Tze Hong.

Sample monuments

Sample awards

Notes

References

Global ethics
Peace organisations based in Austria
Organisations based in Vienna
Austrian awards